Stalin K. is an Indian documentary filmmaker, media and human rights activist. His films, Lesser Humans and India Untouched, on the issue of caste and untouchability in contemporary India, have galvanized international attention to caste discrimination and won numerous film awards. He has done pioneering work on new models of community media to empower marginalized groups. His interview and clips from his film were featured in Episode 10: Dignity for All of Aamir Khan’s Satyamev Jayate TV series on the issue of Untouchability.

He co-founded the community media initiative Video Volunteers in 2013. In 2018, allegations were made against him of inappropriate conduct at the workspace. In 2020, the charges were dismissed.

Biography 

Stalin K. was born in Pune, and grew up in Gujarat. He studied Development Communication in Ahmedabad. Today he lives and works in Goa.

Work 

Stalin K. co-founded Drishti Media Collective as a trust in 1993. The media and human rights organization is based in Ahmedabad, India. He was director of the organization until 2008. His work involved training marginalized groups in participatory media techniques as well as producing and distributing community stories to give these communities a voice in the public sphere.

He is the President and co-founder of Community Radio Forum of India, an association of community radio broadcasters and advocates. Along with other founders of the Forum he drafted the new Community Radio Policy. The policy is in operation since 2006 and secures communities the right to own and run their own radio stations.
He set up one of the first community radio projects in Kutch, which covered stories from local communities.

In 2005 he co-conceived the Community Video Unit model of Video Volunteers. As Founder & India Director of Video Volunteers he set up media projects to empower community voices, until he stepped down from his role as Director of Video Volunteers on 13 October due to allegations of sexual misbehavior. In 2010 he launched the world's first ever Community News Feature Service, IndiaUnheard.

Campaigns and Events 

Stalin K. designed more than 20 campaigns and events on various human rights issues including Cricket for Peace, Game4Change, Asia Social Forum and Making Caste Visible at UN World Conference Against Racism.

Teaching and Workshops 
As a visiting lecturer, Stalin K. has taught workshops on development communications and the use of media for empowerment at Universities and NGOs in India and the United States, like the Tata Institute of Social Sciences, Centre for Development Communication and Boston University.  He has trained over 400 people who have worked as Community Correspondents on gender as leader of Video Volunteers. With the women Correspondents, the focus is on developing them as powerful community leaders and with the men, on ensuring they bring a gender lens into their reporting and personal lives.

Films 

Stalin K. made documentaries on social and human rights issues, like the riots in Gujarat against minorities, gender based discrimination and rights of tribal people in India and America. He filmed the riots against Muslim minorities in Gujarat 2002. The footage was used in court to prove that high rank officials of the state were involved in the riots.
Stalin K. documented caste discrimination against the Dalit communities throughout India with his films IndiaUntouched and Lesser Humans. These films raised international attention to the discrimination of the Dalit communities in India.

#Metoo Allegations & Inquiry 

In October 2018, 2 women who have worked with Stalin K accused him of sexual harassment in the workplace. The allegations included inappropriate touching and unwanted advances. Institutions like The School of Media & Culture Studies at Tata Institute of Social Sciences, Mumbai and WITNESS released statements disassociating themselves from Stalin.

Stalin K issued a statement on Twitter denying any wrongdoing. In response, many more women, some of whom were ex-employees and associates, came out with further allegations of sexual harassment against Stalin K that they had either undergone and heard about. On 18 October 2018, Video Volunteers released a statement which mentioned that Stalin K had stepped down from his position of 'Director' at 'Video Volunteers'.

Despite the organisational statement claiming that Stalin will no longer be engaged with the daily activities and programs of the organization as well as not represent the organization, leaked internal emails in December 2018, show that Stalin continued to engaged in various capacities. Even as the allegations against him were under investigation, Stalin continued to be associated with the organisation as the Managing Trustee.

In July 2020, the Video Volunteers Board announced in a statement on its website that the Local Complaints Committee at the Office of the Collector North Goa dismissed the charge of sexual harassment against Stalin K. The note mentioned that the finding was in alignment with the results of an independent investigation by the Video Volunteers Board of Directors.

Filmography 

1992: 'Kali Kem Mari?/ Why Did Kali Die?', this film follows a social health worker dealing with the death of a village woman, Kali.
1992: 'A Bundleful of Fear/ Ek Poltlun Beek Nu', this is a dramatized narrative of 5 village women and their struggle for justice and gender equality.
1993: 'From Strength to Strength/ Basti se Basti tak', this is a film on the experiences of Shakti Mahila Sangathan, a women's group working in an urban slum called Millatnagar in Ahmedabad.
1994: 'These Forests are Ours/ Jungle Amaru Tantra Tamaru', this film focuses on the violation of human rights of the tribals, their right over their forests and the importance of consolidation of land and resources in the hands of the communities.
1994:'Ta Talati No Ta', this film seeks to demystify for rural audiences the functions, powers and duties of a Talati-cum-mantri (Land Record Officer), who in many cases becomes a focal point of bureaucratic power and cause of distress to many.
1995: 'Kalavar Mat/Triumph Over Time', the film discusses the reconstruction choices available to the victims of an earthquake in Maharashtra 1994, through the plays and songs of a traveling folk theatre group.
1996: 'Gam Nathi Koi Paanch Nu/ The Self in Self-Rule', in the context of the 73rd Amendment, reserving 33% panchayat seats for women, this film explores through a dramatic narrative the moral and ethical dilemmas that face a conscientious woman sarpanch, as she begins to negotiate the male-dominated, corrupt and self-serving world of politics.
1998: 'Lesser Humans', this film investigates the lives of manual scavengers, whose inhuman caste-based occupation is to manually dispose of human excreta.
1999: 'Patta Patta Akshar Hoga/ Every Leaf A Letter', the film documents the emergence of 'Jago Behna' in Dumka Jharkhand – a rural women's collective that was formed as result of the literacy campaign but went on to take up several other issues affecting their lives.
1999: 'Aftermath of the cyclone in Kutch', this film is a tool to draw attention and mobilize funds for rehabilitation, after a cyclone hit Kutch district of Gujarat in May 1999, for the second time in 2 years.
2002: 'Gujarat – A work in progress', the film unfolds the systematic violence on the minorities in Gujarat in 2002 with footage from the riots.
2005: 'Our Water, Our Future', a film that documents how in tribes in Wyoming, US have been unable to exercise their basic rights.
2007: 'India Untouched: Stories of a People Apart', documents Untouchability all over India showing the gravity of discrimination against Dalits and critiques the justification of this systematic oppression by the caste system.

Awards and recognitions 
2007 India Untouched:

 Silver Dhow, Second-best Documentary, Zanzibar International Film Festival, Tanzania, July 2008
 Golden Conch, Best Documentary, Mumbai International Film Festival, February 2008
 Best Film of the Festival, Mumbai International Film Festival, February 2008
 Best Documentary, Mahindra IAAC Film Festival, New York, November 2007
Best Film, One Billion Eyes Film Festival, Chennai, India, August 2007

1993 Lesser Human

 Excellence Award, Earth Vision Film Festival, Tokyo, 1999
Best Film, New Delhi Video Festival, 1999
Silver Conch, 5th Mumbai International Film Festival, 1998
Special Mention, Amnesty International Film Festival, Amsterdam, 1998

References

External links 
  The official website of VideoVolunteers
  The community news channel IndiaUnheard
 Dristhi media
  Lesser Humans uploaded by Asian Human Rights Commission
  India Untouched on CultureUnplugged

Indian documentary filmmakers
Indian human rights activists
20th-century Indian film directors
Living people
Artists from Ahmedabad
Artists from Pune
Film directors from Maharashtra
21st-century Indian film directors
Year of birth missing (living people)